Gierek may refer to:

People
 Adam Gierek (born 1938), Polish post-communism politician and son of Edward Gierek
  (born 1938), Polish ophthalmologist and professor
 Edward Gierek (1913–2001), Polish communist politician
  (1918–2007), wife of Edward Gierek

See also
 Gierek decade, in the history of Poland
 Gerek, Horasan, Turkey
 Gierke (disambiguation)

Polish-language surnames